Ket Sivan (born February 6, 1981) is a Cambodian swimmer, who specialized in sprint freestyle events. Ket qualified for the women's 50 m freestyle, by receiving a Universality place from FINA in an entry time of 34.68. She challenged six other swimmers in heat two, including 14-year-olds Sameera Al-Bitar of Bahrain and Christal Clashing of Antigua and Barbuda. She posted a lifetime best of 34.62 to save a seventh spot over Laos' Vilayphone Vongphachanh by nearly two seconds. Ket failed to advance into the semifinals, as she placed seventy-first overall out of 75 swimmers on the last day of preliminaries.

In early 2013, Ket was named deputy officer under the athletes' commission for the National Olympic Committee of Cambodia.

References

External links
 

1981 births
Living people
Olympic swimmers of Cambodia
Swimmers at the 2004 Summer Olympics
Cambodian female freestyle swimmers
Sportspeople from Phnom Penh